Richard Joseph Tarrant Jr. (born September 15, 1928)  was the head men's basketball coach at the University of Richmond from 1981 through 1993. Tarrant, led the Spiders to five NCAA tournament and four NIT berths in his twelve seasons as head coach—the first postseason appearances in school history.

Tarrant was raised in Englewood, New Jersey. He attended St. Cecilia High School in Englewood, where his basketball coach was Vince Lombardi.

Under Tarrant, the Spiders gained a reputation as giant killers. In their first NCAA appearance, in 1984, they upended an Auburn team led by Charles Barkley in the first round. In 1988, they defeated defending national champion Indiana and Georgia Tech to advance to the Sweet Sixteen—the deepest run by a Colonial Athletic Association team at the time—before losing to Temple. In 1991, Tarrant led the 15th seed Spiders to an upset win over second-seeded Syracuse—the first time that a 15th seed had made it out of the first round.

In 2013, Tarrant was inducted into the Virginia Sports Hall of Fame. In 2015, Richmond named the playing surface at the Robins Center "Dick Tarrant Court" in Tarrant's honor. He left Richmond as the winningest coach in school history, though he has since been passed by current coach Chris Mooney.

Head coaching record

References

1931 births
Living people
American men's basketball coaches
American men's basketball players
Basketball coaches from New Jersey
Basketball players from New Jersey
College men's basketball head coaches in the United States
Fordham Rams men's basketball coaches
Fordham Rams men's basketball players
High school basketball coaches in the United States
People from Englewood, New Jersey
Sportspeople from Bergen County, New Jersey
Sportspeople from Jersey City, New Jersey
St. Cecilia High School (New Jersey) alumni
Richmond Spiders men's basketball coaches